Štěpán Janáček (born 12 June 1977 in Prague) is a Czech former pole vaulter.

He finished eighth at the 2001 World Indoor Championships, second at the 2001 Summer Universiade and fifth at the 2002 European Championships. He also competed at the World Championships in 1999, 2001 and 2003 as well as the 2000, 2004 and 2008 Olympic Games without reaching the finals.

His personal best jump is 5.76 metres, achieved in June 2002 in Prague. The Czech record is currently held by Adam Ptáček with 5.80 metres.

He is married to a Polish former sprinter, Grażyna Prokopek.

Competition record

References

1977 births
Living people
Czech male pole vaulters
Athletes (track and field) at the 2000 Summer Olympics
Athletes (track and field) at the 2004 Summer Olympics
Athletes (track and field) at the 2008 Summer Olympics
Olympic athletes of the Czech Republic
Athletes from Prague
Universiade medalists in athletics (track and field)
Czech decathletes
Universiade silver medalists for the Czech Republic
Competitors at the 1999 Summer Universiade
Medalists at the 2001 Summer Universiade